Started a Fire is the first album by the British rock band One Night Only. It was released on 11 February 2008.

The album entered the UK Album Chart at number 10 and has had a certification of gold in the UK with sales over 100,000.

Track listing

Certifications

Singles 
"You and Me" was released as the debut single on 29 October 2007. It reached number 46 on the UK Singles Chart. The B-side for the CD is "What's Your Melody". The vinyl formats have either "Nintendo" or "Go Go Go". Their video for "You and Me" was posted on MySpace and was so well received that MySpace asked the band to make a short film, "One Night Only Welcomes You to Helmsley". A new video was produced to coincide with a rerelease of the single on 7 July 2008. The music video was produced by Agile Films and directed by Lucy Cash. British actress & model, Anna Brewster, plays the lead female opposite the band. It features the band caught in the middle of a large bar brawl and was filmed at The Palm Tree, Mile End. The fight director was Tim Klotz and features members of Scarlet blade theatre as the stunt team.

References 

2008 albums
One Night Only (band) albums
Vertigo Records albums